The economics concept of a merit good, originated by Richard Musgrave (1957, 1959), is a commodity which is judged that an individual or society should have on the basis of some concept of benefit, rather than ability and willingness to pay. The term is, perhaps, less often used presently than it was during the 1960s to 1980s but the concept still motivates many economic actions by governments. Examples include in-kind transfers such as the provision of food stamps to assist nutrition, the delivery of health services to improve quality of life and reduce morbidity, and subsidized housing and education.

Definition 
A merit good can be defined as a good which would be under-consumed (and under-produced) by a free market economy, due to two main reasons:

 When consumed, a merit good creates positive externalities (an externality being a third party/spill-over effect of the consumption or production of the good/service). This means that there is a divergence between private benefit and public benefit when a merit good is consumed (i.e. the public benefit is greater than the private benefit). However, as consumers only take into account private benefits when consuming most goods, it means that they are under-consumed (and so under-produced).
 Individuals are short-term utility maximisers and so do not take into account the long term benefits of consuming a merit good, so they are under-consumed.

Justification 
In many cases, merit goods provide services which should apply universally to everyone in a particular situation, an opinion that is similar to that of the concept of primary goods found in work by philosopher John Rawls or discussions about social inclusion. Lester Thurow claims that merit goods (and in-kind transfers) are justified based on "individual-societal preferences": just as we, as a society, permit each adult citizen an equal vote in elections, we should also entitle each person an equal right to life, and hence an equal right to life-saving medical care.

On the supply side, it is sometimes suggested that there will be more endorsement in society for implicit redistribution via the provision of certain kinds of goods and services, rather than explicit redistribution through income.

It is sometimes suggested that society in general may be in a better position to determine what individuals need, since individuals might act irrationally (for example, poor people receiving monetary transfers might use them to buy alcoholic drinks rather than nutritious food).

Sometimes, merit and demerit goods (goods which are considered to affect the consumer negatively, but not society in general) are simply considered as an extension of the idea of externalities. A merit good may be described as a good that has positive externalities associated with it. Thus, an inoculation against a contagious disease may be considered as a merit good, because others who may not catch the disease from the inoculated person also benefit.

However, merit and demerit goods can be defined in a different manner without reference to externalities. Consumers can be considered to under-consume merit goods (and over-consume demerit goods) due to an information failure. This happens because most consumers do not perceive quite how good or bad the good is for them: either they do not have the right information or lack relevant information. With this definition, a merit good is defined as a good that is better for a person than the person who may consume the good realises.

Other possible rationales for treating some commodities as merit (or demerit) goods include public-goods aspects of a commodity, imposing community standards (prostitution, drugs, etc.), immaturity or incapacity, and addiction.  A common element of all of these is recommending for or against some goods on a basis other than consumer choice. For the case of education, it can be argued that those lacking education are incapable of making an informed choice about the benefits of education, which would warrant compulsion (Musgrave, 1959, 14).  In this case, the implementation of consumer sovereignty is the motivation, rather than rejection of consumer sovereignty.

Public Choice Theory suggests that good government policies are an under-supplied merit good in a democracy.

Criticism 
Arguments about the irrational behavior of welfare receivers are often criticised for being paternalistic, often by those who would like to reduce to a minimum economic activity by government.

The principle of consumer sovereignty in welfare also suggests that monetary transfers are preferable to in-kind transfers of the same cost.

References

 Richard A. Musgrave (1957).  "A Multiple Theory of Budget Determination," FinanzArchiv, New Series 25(1), pp. 33–43.
_ (1959). The Theory of Public Finance, pp. 13–15.
_ (1987). "merit goods,", " The New Palgrave: A Dictionary of Economics, v. 3, pp.  452-53.
 Richard A. Musgrave and Peggy B. Musgrave (1973). Public Finance in Theory and Practice, pp. 80-81.
 Roger Lee Mendoza ([2007]  2011).  "Merit Goods at Fifty:  Reexamining Musgrave's Theory in the Context of Health Policy."  Review of Economic and Business Studies, v. 4 (2), pp. 275–284.
 Amartya K. Sen ([1977] 1982). "Rational Fools: A Critique of the Behavioral Foundations of Economic Theory," in Choice, Welfare and Measurement, pp. 84–106. (1977 JSTOR version)

Goods (economics)